Rami Sebei (born July 12, 1984) is a Canadian professional wrestler. He is currently signed to WWE, where he performs on the SmackDown brand under the ring name Sami Zayn.

Prior to joining WWE, Sebei wrestled for Ring of Honor under the ring name El Generico, using the character of a luchador from Mexico with the catchphrase "Olé!" He wrestled while masked from his debut in 2002 until 2013. Upon signing with WWE, he began wrestling without a mask, eventually winning the NXT Championship while in WWE's developmental brand NXT, and after being promoted to the main roster, he would become a three-time Intercontinental Champion. Starting in 2022, Sebei’s popularity with fans began to soar due to his critically acclaimed work with The Bloodline.

Sebei achieved much success in Pro Wrestling Guerrilla (PWG) as a two-time PWG World Champion and five-time World Tag Team Champion. He is the only person to have won both of PWG's annual tournaments, the Dynamite Duumvirate Tag Team Title Tournament in 2010 and the Battle of Los Angeles in 2011. He has also held the ROH World Television Championship and the ROH World Tag Team Championship as part of a team with Kevin Steen, with whom he later earned the 2010 Feud of the Year award from the Wrestling Observer Newsletter. He is also a two-time IWS World Heavyweight Champion for the Montreal-based International Wrestling Syndicate (IWS). Having wrestled internationally, he won the wXw Unified World Wrestling Championship in Germany and DDT Pro-Wrestling's KO-D Openweight Championship in Japan.

Early life 
Rami Sebei was born on July 12, 1984, in Laval, Quebec. Both of his parents are Syrian immigrants to Canada, having relocated from Homs in the 1970s.

Professional wrestling career

Debut and International Wrestling Syndicate (2002–2009) 
Sebei trained under Jerry Tuite and Savio Vega and made his professional wrestling debut on March 1, 2002, for the FLQ promotion in Quebec as Stevie McFly. On July 14, 2002, as El Generico, he made his International Wrestling Syndicate (IWS) debut at the Scarred For Life event in a count out victory. On October 18, 2003, at Blood, Sweat and Beers, Generico lost to Carl Ouellet in a three-way match also involving Kevin Steen. On November 15 at Payback's A Bitch, El Generico defeated Kevin Steen in their first-ever singles match against each other. IWS held its fifth-anniversary show "V" on June 15, 2004, at Le SPAG, where Generico defeated PCO in an IWS title match for his first IWS World Heavyweight Championship, only to have Kevin Steen reclaim his number one contendership won earlier in the night against Excess 69. Generico lost to Steen for the IWS World Heavyweight Championship.

On September 11 at CZW High Stakes II, Generico, Steen and Excess 69 lost to SeXXXy Eddy in an IWS four-way match which was unofficially chosen as "CZW Match of the Year". On August 20, 2005, at Extreme Dream II, Generico lost to Chris Bishop in the Extreme Dream Tournament final match for the IWS Canadian Championship. On February 16, 2008, Generico defeated Kevin Steen for the IWS World Heavyweight Championship at Violent Valentine. On March 22, at Know Your Enemies, Generico lost the IWS World Heavyweight Championship to Steen a three-way match also involving Max Boyer.

Pro Wrestling Guerrilla (2004–2013) 
In 2004, members of the IWS started making appearances in the popular independent company Pro Wrestling Guerrilla (PWG). El Generico held the PWG World Tag Team Championship five times with four different partners: with Human Tornado as 2 Skinny Black Guys, Quicksilver as Cape Fear, Kevin Steen, and Paul London as ¡Peligro Abejas!. Generico is also the only participant to consecutively appear in the first eight Battle of Los Angeles tournaments from 2005. On February 24, 2007, Generico defeated former partner Tornado to win the PWG World Championship during his title run with Cape Fear. Later that year, while Generico was still World Champion, he and Steen defeated PAC and Roderick Strong for the belts, making Generico the only man in PWG history to hold both the World and World Tag Team titles not once, but twice at the same time.

In mid-2009, Generico entered a lengthy feud with the tag team Men of Low Moral Fiber, consisting of Kenny Omega and Chuck Taylor, recruiting Colt Cabana, referee Rick Knox, and former partner Human Tornado (effectively reuniting 2 Skinny Black Guys) to stand by his side. At PWG's sixth anniversary event, Threemendous II, 2 Skinny Black Guys defeated current champions The Young Bucks in a non-title match, giving the Bucks their first tag team loss in almost a year and a half. On November 21 during the second night of the 2009 Battle of Los Angeles, Generico and Kevin Steen lost a title match against the Bucks. Later, he and Cabana saved the new PWG World Champion Kenny Omega from Brian Kendrick and the Bucks and made peace with him as they now had a common enemy.

On May 9, 2010, Generico teamed up with "Intrepid Traveler" Paul London to form a duo introduced as ¡Peligro Abejas! (translated as Danger Bees!) in the fourth annual Dynamite Duumvirate Tag Team Title Tournament eight-team tag tournament. After defeating Chuck Taylor and Scott Lost in the first round and the Briscoe Brothers (Jay and Mark) in the semifinals, Generico and London defeated the Young Bucks in the finals of the tournament to not only win DDT4, but also the PWG World Tag Team Championship, Generico's fifth time holding the title. On December 11, 2010, El Generico earned himself a shot at the PWG World Championship, when ¡Peligro Abejas! successfully defended the PWG World Tag Team Championship against Chris Hero and the PWG World Champion, Claudio Castagnoli, the team known collectively as The Kings of Wrestling. Generico received his shot at the PWG World Championship on January 29, 2011, during the WrestleReunion 5 weekend, but was defeated by Castagnoli. On April 9, El Generico teamed with Ricochet, who filled in for London who was unable to appear at the event, in a match, where they lost the PWG World Tag Team Championship back to The Young Bucks. On August 20, Generico entered the 2011 Battle of Los Angeles, defeating Claudio Castagnoli and Willie Mack in his first round and semifinal matches. Later that same night, Generico defeated old rival Kevin Steen in the finals to win the tournament, becoming the first person to have won the PWG World and World Tag Team championships as well as the DDT4 and Battle of Los Angeles tournaments. In the process, Generico also earned himself a match for Steen's PWG World Championship. On October 22, El Generico defeated Steen in a ladder match, following outside interference from The Young Bucks, to win the PWG World Championship for the second time. On March 17, 2012, El Generico re-lost the title to Steen in a three-way match, which also included Eddie Edwards. After agreeing to a deal with WWE, El Generico made his farewell appearance for PWG on January 12, 2013, when he and Kevin Steen entered the 2013 Dynamite Duumvirate Tag Team Title Tournament. After wins over the Briscoe Brothers and Future Shock (Adam Cole and Kyle O'Reilly), El Generico and Steen were defeated in the finals of the tournament by The Young Bucks.

Chikara (2005–2012) 

On February 19, 2005, El Generico made his debut for Philadelphia, Pennsylvania–based promotion Chikara, taking part in the 2005 Tag World Grand Prix, where he teamed with Kevin Steen as Team IWS. The team made it to the quarterfinals of the tournament, before being defeated by the SuperFriends (Chris Hero and Mike Quackenbush).

El Generico returned to Chikara three years later to take part in the 2008 King of Trios, where he teamed with Player Uno and Stupefied, again, as Team IWS. After defeating the F1rst Family (Arik Cannon, Darin Corbin and Ryan Cruz) in their first round match on March 1, Team IWS was eliminated from the tournament later that same day by Los Luchadores de Mexico (Incognito, Lince Dorado and El Pantera), who went on to win the entire tournament. The following year, on March 27, El Generico returned for the 2009 King of Trios, this time teaming with Matt and Nick Jackson as Team PWG. They were eliminated from the tournament in the first round by The Osirian Portal (Amasis, Escorpion Egipcio and Ophidian). The following day El Generico entered the Rey de Voladores tournament, but was defeated by Kota Ibushi in his four-way elimination semifinal match, which also included Jigsaw and Nick Jackson. On the third night of the tournament, El Generico was defeated by Arik Cannon in a singles match.

El Generico's next appearance for Chikara occurred almost two years later on January 23, 2011, when he faced Eddie Kingston in a losing effort. For the 2011 King of Trios El Generico came together with 3.0 (Scott Parker and Shane Matthews) to form ¡3.0le!. The team was eliminated from the tournament in the first round by The Osirian Portal (Amasis, Hieracon and Ophidian). The following day El Generico entered his second Rey de Voladores and defeated Pinkie Sanchez, Zack Sabre Jr. and Marshe Rockett in his four-way elimination semifinal match to qualify for the following day's finals. The following day El Generico defeated the 1–2–3 Kid in the finals to win the 2011 Rey de Voladores. El Generico returned to Chikara on July 30, 2011, when he reunited ¡3.0le! with Scott Parker and Shane Matthews in a six-man tag team match, where they defeated F.I.S.T. (Chuck Taylor, Icarus and Johnny Gargano). The following day ¡3.0le! was defeated by the Spectral Envoy (Frightmare, Hallowicked and UltraMantis Black) in a six-man tag team match.

Ring of Honor (2005–2012) 
El Generico first wrestled for Ring of Honor (ROH) in 2005, earning a spot in a Four Corner Survival match at Do Or Die IV. He teamed with the Ring Crew Express (Dunn and Marcos) in the Trios Tournament 2005, losing to the Rottweilers. At Stalemate, he lost to Roderick Strong, then teaming with Sal Rinauro against The Embassy at New Frontiers (and losing). He only received a few more matches, losing to Austin Aries at Fate of an Angel and getting his first win against fellow IWS alumnus Kevin Steen at The Homecoming (a match that didn't even make it to the event's DVD). His final ROH match of this run was a loss to Homicide at Dragon Gate Invasion.

Generico returned to ROH in late 2006, making an appearance at Dethroned, where he was defeated by Brent Albright. Following this, he took part in (and lost) a Four Corner Survival match to Jimmy Rave at Final Battle 2006. In 2007, El Generico formed a permanent team with Kevin Steen, taking on the Briscoe Brothers at the Fifth Year Festival: Philly. Much like many previous matches, they were defeated in this encounter, but the two men had a memorable showing that eventually earned them a full-time spot on the roster. Throughout 2007, the two teams feuded with one another, having several memorable matches including (but not limited to) a great match on the Driven pay-per-view, ROH's second-ever. Their feud came to an end following a brutal Street Fight at Death Before Dishonor V: Night 1, a steel cage match at Caged Rage, a two out of three falls match at Manhattan Mayhem 2 and a ladder match advertised as a "Ladder War" at Man Up. This final match became the Main Event of ROH's third pay-per-view.

Also during this time, Generico broke out as a singles competitor, having a strong run in the Race to the Top Tournament of 2007. He defeated (in order) Delirious, Chris Hero and Davey Richards, only to lose in the final match of the tournament to Claudio Castagnoli. After the feud with the Briscoes ended, Generico and Steen spent several months feuding with the Hangmen Three in an inconclusive feud that carried on into 2008. They also worked through the tag ranks and attempted to win the tag titles, but came up short in a tag title tournament at Up For Grabs. Generico took ROH World champion Nigel McGuinness to the limit at Age of Insanity, but eventually lost.

On September 19, 2008, Generico and Steen finally won the ROH World Tag Team Championship by beating The Age of the Fall at Driven. Generico lost a second match to McGuinness at Glory by Honor VII. Generico was booked in another match against McGuinness at Caged Collision, which he lost. On April 10, 2009, at a television taping, Generico and Steen lost the ROH World Tag Team Championship to The American Wolves (Eddie Edwards and Davey Richards). Generico then suffered a knee injury, sustaining damage to his Medial collateral ligament.

On December 19, 2009, at Final Battle 2009, ROH's first live pay-per-view, after a loss to The Young Bucks, Steen turned heel by attacking El Generico. He then formed a team with Colt Cabana and together the two of them started a feud with Steen and his new partner Steve Corino. At the following pay-per-view, The Big Bang!, Generico and Cabana defeated Steen and Corino via disqualification when Steen used a chair on his former partner. On June 19 at Death Before Dishonor VIII, Steen defeated El Generico in a singles match. On September 11 at Glory By Honor IX Generico and Cabana defeated Steen and Corino in a Double Chain match, when Cabana forced Corino to tap out. After the match Steen attacked El Generico and unmasked him. On December 18 at Final Battle 2010 El Generico and Steen ended their year-long feud in an unsanctioned Fight Without Honor, where Generico put his mask on the line against Steen's ROH career. In the weeks leading up to the event, Generico debuted a new darker character and an all-black outfit. In the end El Generico won the match and thus forced Steen out of Ring of Honor. On March 2, 2011, ROH announced that El Generico had signed a new contract with the promotion.

On April 1 at the first night of Honor Takes Center Stage, El Generico was defeated by Michael Elgin from the House of Truth following interference from a masked man, led by Truth Martini. The following day, El Generico defeated another member of the House of Truth, Roderick Strong, but after the match was attacked by Elgin and Martini. Colt Cabana came out to make the save but was stopped by the House of Truth's advantage in numbers. This led to Christopher Daniels coming out, but he ended up turning heel and hitting El Generico with the Book of Truth and Cabana with the Angel's Wings, thus joining the House of Truth and revealing himself as the man who had cost El Generico his match against Elgin. On June 26 at Best in the World 2011, Generico defeated Daniels to win the ROH World Television Championship. He lost the title to Jay Lethal on August 13 at the first Ring of Honor Wrestling tapings under the Sinclair Broadcast Group banner. On March 30, 2012, at Showdown in the Sun, El Generico faced the reinstated Kevin Steen in a losing effort in a Last Man Standing match and then disappeared from ROH. After Steen successfully defended the ROH World Championship on October 13 at Glory By Honor XI: The Unbreakable Hope, he received a parcel containing Generico's mask. El Generico returned to ROH on December 16 at Final Battle 2012: Doomsday, where he unsuccessfully challenged Steen for the ROH World Championship in a ladder war. This was his last appearance with ROH before signing with WWE.

Dragon Gate (2007–2009) 
Generico travelled to Japan during the summer of 2007, where he worked for the Dragon Gate (DG) promotion as the gaijin (foreign) representative of the New Hazard stable. He returned to the promotion in July 2008, where he was announced as Tozawa-juku's "foreign exchange student." El Generico made his third tour of Dragon Gate in October 2009, when he wrestled as a member of the Kamikaze stable.

DDT Pro-Wrestling (2011–2012) 
In early 2011, El Generico began making semi-regular appearances for the Japanese DDT Pro-Wrestling sister-promotion Union Pro Wrestling, making his debut on January 3 with a win over Shinichiro Tominaga. On September 19, El Generico won his first title in Japan, when he defeated Isami Kodaka for the DDT Extreme Championship. After successful title defenses against Shuji Ishikawa and Sanshiro Takagi, he re-lost the title to Kodaka on January 3, 2012. El Generico has also made some appearances for Union Pro's parent promotion, DDT Pro-Wrestling, most notably defeating Kota Ibushi in Ibushi's return match from a shoulder injury on May 4, 2012. On August 18, El Generico wrestled his first match in the Nippon Budokan, defeating the debuting Konosuke Takeshita. On September 30, El Generico defeated Kota Ibushi to win the KO-D Openweight Championship, DDT's top title. El Generico made his first successful title defense on October 21 in a rematch against Ibushi. On November 25, El Generico defeated KO-D Tag Team Champion Mikami for his second successful defense of the KO-D Openweight Championship. On December 23, El Generico lost the KO-D Openweight Championship to Kenny Omega in his third defense.

Dragon Gate USA and Evolve (2012) 
On March 31, 2012, El Generico made his debut for Dragon Gate USA (DGUSA), when he defeated Chuck Taylor, Cima, Lince Dorado, Rich Swann and Samuray del Sol in a six-way match. On April 13, El Generico made his debut for Evolve, a promotion closely affiliated with DGUSA, losing to Low Ki. After another loss to Ricochet on May 11, El Generico picked up his first win in the promotion on May 12 by defeating Sami Callihan. El Generico then had two singles matches against Samuray del Sol; the first on June 28 at Evolve 14 was won by El Generico and the rematch the following day at Evolve 15 was won by Samuray. El Generico returned to Dragon Gate USA on July 28, when he and Samuray were defeated in a tag team match by A. R. Fox and Cima. On September 8, El Generico and Samuray del Sol faced off in another Evolve main event, which was won by El Generico. On November 4 at Dragon Gate USA's Freedom Fight 2012, El Generico teamed with Samuray in a tag team match, where they defeated Genki Horiguchi and Ryo Saito. The two continued their winning ways on December 8 at Evolve 18, where they defeated the Super Smash Bros. (Player Uno and Stupefied).

Other promotions (2005–2013) 
From 2005 onwards, El Generico has made several appearances for the German Westside Xtreme Wrestling (wXw) promotion. On March 4, 2012, El Generico defeated Tommy End to win wXw's 2012 16 Carat Gold Tournament. On May 19, El Generico defeated Big van Walter to also win the wXw Unified World Wrestling Championship. On August 12, 2012, he lost the title to Axel Tischer in a four-way match, which also included Bad Bones and Karsten Beck. In October 2009 El Generico traveled to Poland to take part in Do or Die Wrestling's event in Warsaw, defeating Michael Kovac in the main event of the show. In May 2010, Generico competed in the main-event of Capital City Championship Combat's show, Stand Alone. On October 23, Generico competed at Pro Wrestling Superstars' inaugural show in Jacksonville, North Carolina, where he teamed with Paul London to defeat Joey Silvia and Jake Manning.

On January 11, 2011, El Generico wrestled in a tryout dark match for Total Nonstop Action Wrestling (TNA) at the promotion's Impact! tapings, losing to Amazing Red. The following day he defeated T. J. Perkins in another dark match. On April 20, 2011, El Generico made his South American debut, when he wrestled for Peruvian promotion Leader Wrestling Association (LWA), facing Apocalipsis, Axl and Kaiser in a number one contender's match to determine a challenger for Caoz, the promotion's "Campeón Máximo". In the end, Kaiser came out of the match victorious. On April 24, El Generico wrestled for Chilean promotion Xplosion Nacional de Lucha (XNL), losing to Crazy Sid in an XNL Championship number one contender's three-way match, which also included XL. On February 26, 2012, El Generico visited Russia for the first time, making his debut for the Independent Wrestling Federation (IWF), where he faced Ivan "Locomotive" Markov and won. Later in the year, on September 16, they wrestled in a rematch and this time Markov was victorious. On September 8, 2012, Generico made an appearance for Combat Zone Wrestling (CZW), unsuccessfully challenging Masada for the CZW World Heavyweight Championship.

After signing with WWE, El Generico made his final Canadian independent appearance on January 18, 2013, when he worked for the Hart Legacy Wrestling (HLW) promotion in Calgary. In the opening four-way elimination match, El Generico and Samuray del Sol were victorious over Cam!kaze and Pete Wilson, Brian Cage and Trent Barreta, and Andrew Hawkes and Ryan Rollins. As a result, the two earned a spot in the main event ten man tag team match, where they teamed with Barreta, Davey Boy Smith Jr. and Jack Evans in a losing effort against the team of Teddy Hart, Brian Cage, Cam!kaze, Flip Kendrick and Pete Wilson, with Generico being pinned for the win by Hart.

WWE

NXT Champion (2013–2015) 

In January 2013, Sebei signed with WWE after passing all medical tests. On February 13, Sebei made his debut for WWE's developmental territory NXT, but did not wrestle. Sebei's NXT in-ring debut took place at a live event on March 7 in Tampa, Florida, wrestling a tag team match unmasked under his real name. Sebei eventually settled on the ring name Sami Zayn. Zayn made his televised debut on the May 22 episode of NXT, first defeating Curt Hawkins in the opening match and then challenging and scoring an upset win over Antonio Cesaro later in the show. The following week, he took part in an 18-man battle royal to determine the number one contender to the NXT Championship, but was eliminated by Mason Ryan. On the June 12 episode of NXT, Zayn suffered his first pinfall loss in NXT in a rematch with Cesaro. On the July 17 NXT, Zayn failed to win another number one contender's match also involving Cesaro and Leo Kruger. On the July 31 episode of NXT, Zayn teamed with NXT Champion Bo Dallas against Cesaro and Kruger; after Cesaro and Zayn brawled to the back, Dallas lost the match and later blamed Zayn for the loss. On the August 21 episode of NXT, Zayn lost to Cesaro in a two-out-of-three falls match to conclude the feud. On September 6, Zayn made his WWE debut at a house show in his hometown of Montreal, where he defeated Cesaro. When Zayn targeted Dallas' NXT Championship, Dallas cost Zayn his match against Cesaro's fellow Real American Jack Swagger. Dallas held an open challenge to determine the next title contender, but he banned Zayn from competing. However, Zayn masqueraded as the masked El Local and defeated Dallas to earn his title shot. The match occurred on the October 16 episode of NXT, but NXT General Manager John Bradshaw Layfield restarted the match when Zayn won despite Dallas' foot being on the ropes and then Dallas sent Zayn into an exposed turnbuckle to retain his title.

In November 2013, after tying a Beat the Clock challenge with Adrian Neville by defeating Leo Kruger, Zayn lost a number one contender's match to Neville on the November 27 episode of NXT. Zayn moved on to feud with Kruger and the feud culminated in Zayn winning a two-out-of-three falls match on the January 1, 2014 episode of NXT. After that, Zayn's obsession with his loss to Cesaro the previous year led to him challenging Cesaro to a rematch at NXT Arrival on February 27, which he lost, but Cesaro showed respect to Zayn after the match. Zayn then feuded with Corey Graves, with Zayn losing to Graves via referee stoppage on the April 3 episode of NXT after Graves capitalized on Zayn's head injury. On the May 8 episode of NXT, Zayn participated in a 20-man battle royal for an NXT Championship shot, with Zayn being involved in a triple threat match tie. As a result, Zayn faced the other two winners, Tyler Breeze and Tyson Kidd in a triple threat match on the next episode of NXT, where Kidd won to become number one contender. At NXT TakeOver on May 29, Zayn lost to Breeze in another number one contender's match.

In June 2014, Zayn went on to feud with Tyson Kidd after Kidd abandoned him during their match against NXT Tag Team Champions The Ascension. After Zayn defeated Justin Gabriel, both Kidd and Gabriel attacked Zayn, who was saved by his friend, NXT Champion Adrian Neville. Zayn later defeated Kidd twice to end the feud, once in a singles match on the July 17 episode of NXT as well in a tag match with Adam Rose against Gabriel and Kidd, which was the first round of a tournament for an opportunity at the NXT Tag Team Championship. Zayn and Rose lost in the second round to The Lucha Dragons (Kalisto and Sin Cara). When Zayn, Kidd and Tyler Breeze each staked a claim for an NXT Championship match, champion Neville agreed to face all three in a fatal-four-way match at the next NXT TakeOver event. To hype that match, Zayn and Neville appeared on the September 8 episode of Raw, defeating Breeze and Kidd while making their main roster debuts. At NXT TakeOver: Fatal 4-Way on September 11, Zayn nearly won the four-way match and the NXT Championship, but champion Neville stopped him by dragging the referee out of the ring as he went on to win and retain his title. This caused tension within Neville and Zayn's friendship. After Zayn lost another match, this time to Titus O'Neil, he vowed to start a "road to redemption" leading to the NXT Championship, which saw him defeat Tyson Kidd, Titus O'Neil and Tyler Breeze in singles matches. Zayn was rewarded with a title match against Neville on the November 13 episode of NXT in which Neville appeared to injure himself during the match, but he took advantage on Zayn checking on him to win the match and retain the title. Neville agreed to Zayn's request for a title rematch, with Zayn vowing to quit NXT if he lost.

At NXT TakeOver: R Evolution on December 11, Zayn defeated Neville to win the NXT Championship, and was congratulated by many other NXT wrestlers afterwards, including Neville and Kevin Owens (the former Kevin Steen). The show ended with Owens powerbombing Zayn onto the ring apron to ruin their reunion. Zayn retained the title against Neville in a rematch on the January 14, 2015 episode of NXT, but suffered another post-match attack by Owens. After an irate Zayn demanded a match against Owens, even if it meant putting the title on the line, a title match was set for NXT TakeOver: Rival. At the event on February 11, Owens captured the title from Zayn via referee stoppage, having powerbombed a disorientated Zayn five times, ending his reign at 62 days.

Feud with Kevin Owens (2015–2017) 

On the May 4 episode of Raw, Zayn was introduced by Bret Hart as John Cena's opponent for his weekly "U.S. Open Challenge" for his United States Championship; taking place in his hometown of Montreal. Zayn was heavily favored by the crowd over Cena, but ultimately lost the match. After the match, Cena let Zayn have the ring to an outstanding ovation from the live crowd following the match. However, Zayn had injured his shoulder before the match and underwent an MRI for further analysis. At NXT TakeOver: Unstoppable on May 20, Zayn's NXT Championship rematch against Kevin Owens ended in a no contest when Zayn was unable to continue the match. Owens continued assaulting Zayn until the debuting Samoa Joe made the save. After a seven-month hiatus, Zayn returned from injury on the December 23 episode of NXT (taped at the NXT TakeOver: London event on December 16) and defeated Tye Dillinger. Zayn was defeated by Shinsuke Nakamura in the latter's debut match at NXT TakeOver: Dallas on April 1, after which both were given a standing ovation and while Nakamura left the ring he was left waving goodbyes to the NXT fans, signaling his final appearance in NXT.

On January 24, 2016, at the Royal Rumble, Zayn competed in the Rumble match at #20, eliminating Kevin Owens before being eliminated by Braun Strowman. On the March 7 episode of Raw, Zayn made a surprise return to the main roster and attacked Owens, who was attempting to attack Neville after their match. This led to a tag team match on SmackDown, in which Zayn and Neville defeated Owens and The Miz. Zayn continued to score victories against the likes of The Miz and Stardust. At WrestleMania 32 on April 3, Zayn competed against Owens, Dolph Ziggler, The Miz, Stardust, Sin Cara and Zack Ryder in a ladder match for the Intercontinental Championship, which was won by Ryder. On the April 4 episode of Raw, Zayn was scheduled to compete in a fatal four-way match against Owens, AJ Styles, and Chris Jericho to determine the number one contender for the WWE World Heavyweight Championship, but was attacked by Owens, who attacked him with a Powerbomb through a table backstage, and replaced by a returning Cesaro. Because of the actions of Owens, Shane McMahon gave Zayn another opportunity on the April 11 episode of Raw to become a number one contender by having him face Styles, who had won the contender's match the week before, but Zayn lost to Styles. On the April 18 episode of Raw, McMahon booked Zayn and Owens in a match at Payback on May 1, which Owens won. On the May 9 episode of Raw, Zayn defeated The Miz to enter a fatal four-way match for the Intercontinental Championship at Extreme Rules on May 22, but Miz retained the title. On the May 23 episode of Raw, Zayn defeated Sheamus to qualify for the Money in the Bank ladder match, but at the eponymous event on June 19, he was unsuccessful as the briefcase was won by Dean Ambrose. On July 19 at the 2016 WWE draft, Zayn was drafted to Raw. At Battleground on July 24, Zayn defeated Owens.

At SummerSlam on August 21, Zayn and Neville defeated The Dudley Boyz on the kickoff show. On the September 12 episode of Raw, Zayn appeared on Chris Jericho's Highlight Reel segment, where he was attacked by Jericho, leading to a match at Clash of Champions on September 25, which Jericho won. On the October 17 episode of Raw, Zayn began a feud with Braun Strowman after preventing him from confronting Raw General Manager Mick Foley. On the October 31 episode of Raw, Zayn participated in a battle royal to qualify for Team Raw at Survivor Series, but was last eliminated by Strowman. On the November 1 episode of SmackDown Live, Intercontinental Champion Dolph Ziggler made an open challenge to any wrestler from the Raw brand. The following week, Zayn stated that Mick Foley wanted him to face Ziggler, but Commissioner Stephanie McMahon, who preferred Rusev, made Zayn face Rusev with the winner going on to face Ziggler for the title; Zayn defeated Rusev to earn the title match. On the November 15 episode of SmackDown Live, The Miz defeated Ziggler for the championship and Zayn instead faced The Miz for the Intercontinental Championship at Survivor Series on November 20, which Zayn lost. On the November 21 episode of Raw, Mick Foley ordered Zayn to compete in a match with Braun Strowman as punishment for failing to bring the Intercontinental Championship to Raw; Strowman attacked Zayn before the match and attacked him until Foley came out to stop the match. On the November 28 episode of Raw, during Strowman's match, Zayn attacked Strowman, leading to a faceoff between him and Foley. On the December 12 episode of Raw, after Zayn defeated Jinder Mahal, he refused to be traded to SmackDown and wanted a match with Strowman. The match was made for Roadblock: End of the Line on December 18 with a time limit of 10 minutes, which Zayn won after completing 10 minutes. On the January 2, 2017 episode of Raw, Zayn lost a Last Man Standing match to Strowman, ending the feud.

On the January 23 episode of Raw, Zayn defeated Seth Rollins to win Rollins' opportunity in the Royal Rumble match after Rollins was distracted by Triple H. At the Royal Rumble on January 29, Zayn entered at #8 and lasted over 47 minutes before being eliminated by The Undertaker. On the January 30 episode of Raw, Zayn defeated United States Champion Chris Jericho in a non-title match, but failed to win the title the following week. On the February 13 episode of Raw, Zayn responded to comments made by Samoa Joe during a backstage interview, and was attacked by Joe. At Fastlane on March 5, Zayn lost to Joe. On the March 27 episode of Raw, Zayn defeated Owens in a no disqualification match to end their feud, saving his job and qualifying for Andre The Giant Memorial Battle Royal at WrestleMania 33 on April 2, which he failed to win.

On April 11, Zayn was traded to SmackDown as part of the Superstar Shake-up. The following week on SmackDown Live, Zayn failed to become the number one contender for WWE Championship after losing a six-pack challenge. Zayn defeated Baron Corbin at Backlash on May 21. Zayn was later announced as one of the participants in the Money in the Bank ladder match at the Money in the Bank pay-per-view on June 18 along with AJ Styles, Corbin, Dolph Ziggler, Kevin Owens and Shinsuke Nakamura, in which he was unsuccessful in winning. Zayn was then involved in a brief feud with Mike Kanellis, whom he lost to in the latter's debut match on the July 18 episode of SmackDown. A rematch between the two was set for Battleground on July 23 which Zayn won.

Teaming with Kevin Owens (2017–2019) 

At Hell in a Cell on October 8, Zayn helped Kevin Owens defeat Shane McMahon in a Hell in a Cell match, turning heel for the first time in his WWE career. On the October 10 episode of SmackDown Live, Zayn referred to Owens as his "brother" and explained that his actions were due to McMahon not giving Zayn opportunities despite SmackDown being dubbed the "Land of Opportunity". On the October 24 episode of SmackDown Live, Zayn lost to Randy Orton, failing to acquire a spot on Team SmackDown to face Team Raw at Survivor Series. At the Survivor Series kick-off show on November 19, Zayn and Owens defeated Breezango (Tyler Breeze and Fandango). Later that night, Owens and Zayn interfered in the main event and attacked Shane, which backfired after Shane attacked both with a steel chair and Orton delivered an RKO to Owens. Owens and Zayn defeated Orton and Shinsuke Nakamura in a tag team match at Clash of Champions on December 17 with SmackDown Commissioner Shane McMahon and SmackDown General Manager Daniel Bryan as special guest referees and their jobs on the line after a fast count by Bryan. Zayn and Owens then both scored non-title victories over WWE Champion AJ Styles on respective episodes of SmackDown Live, thus earning a title opportunity against Styles in a handicap match at the Royal Rumble on January 28, where they failed to win the title. Zayn later stole Tye Dillinger's #10 spot at the Royal Rumble match but was eliminated by eventual winner Shinsuke Nakamura.

Zayn walked out on Owens during a tag team match against Styles and Nakamura two nights later on SmackDown Live. Zayn faced Owens on the February 6 episode of SmackDown Live to determine who would face Styles for the WWE Championship at Fastlane, which ended in a double disqualification after Styles, who was on commentary, attacked Zayn and Owens, leading to SmackDown General Manager Daniel Bryan scheduling a triple threat match for the WWE Championship involving both Owens and Zayn. Zayn then said he would lay down for Owens, only for Zayn to pin Owens in a fatal five-way match. At Fastlane on March 11, Styles retained the WWE Championship in the six-pack challenge. On the March 20 episode of SmackDown, Zayn and Owens were (kayfabe) fired by Bryan as punishment for an attack against McMahon the week prior. At WrestleMania 34 on April 8, Owens and Zayn lost to Bryan and McMahon, and would have been rehired to SmackDown if they won. On the following Raw, as free agents, they asked Raw General Manager Kurt Angle for a job. Though reluctant, Angle made a match between the two with the winner earning a Raw contract, which ended in a no contest, leaving them both as free agents. On the April 16 episode of Raw, Zayn and Owens were awarded Raw contracts by Raw Commissioner Stephanie McMahon. At Backlash on May 6, Zayn and Owens faced Bobby Lashley and Braun Strowman in a losing effort. At Money in the Bank on June 17, Zayn lost to Lashley. After the event, it was reported that Zayn had surgery to repair both of his rotator cuffs. He was later reported to have undergone a successful double shoulder surgery.

After ten months of inactivity due to injury, Zayn returned on the April 8, 2019 episode of Raw, losing to Intercontinental Champion Finn Bálor. The following week, Zayn defeated Strowman with the help of Baron Corbin and Drew McIntyre, earning Strowman's spot in the Money in the Bank ladder match. At Money in the Bank on May 19, Zayn was attacked backstage and left unable to compete by what was believed to be Braun Strowman, however it was later revealed to be Brock Lesnar, who took Zayn's place in the match. After the event, Zayn began teaming with Owens again, and they defeated The New Day (Big E and Xavier Woods) at Stomping Grounds on June 23. However, the team of Zayn and Owens drifted apart again after Owens turned face and reignited his feud with Shane McMahon. After their team disbanded, Zayn lost to Rey Mysterio twice, first at Raw Reunion, and second in the gauntlet match the following week. Zayn then competed in the King of the Ring tournament, but lost in the first round to Cedric Alexander.

Intercontinental Champion (2019–2022) 
On the August 20 episode of SmackDown Live, Zayn joined forces with Intercontinental Champion Shinsuke Nakamura after attacking The Miz. Zayn was positioned as Nakamura's mouthpiece. At Clash of Champions on September 15, he helped Nakamura retain his title. As part of the 2019 draft, Zayn was drafted to the SmackDown brand. Following the draft, he would also become the manager of Cesaro. At Survivor Series on November 24, Zayn accompanied Nakamura in a non-title match against United States Champion AJ Styles and NXT North American Champion Roderick Strong, which was won by Strong. On the January 31, 2020 episode of SmackDown, Nakamura lost the title to Braun Strowman, despite interferences from Zayn and Cesaro.

At Elimination Chamber on March 8, Zayn, Nakamura, and Cesaro defeated Braun Strowman in a 3-on-1 handicap match to win the Intercontinental Championship; Zayn won the title by pinning Strowman. On the March 13 episode of SmackDown, Zayn began a feud with Daniel Bryan, during which Bryan and Drew Gulak faced Zayn's Artist Collective partners Shinsuke Nakamura and Cesaro in various matches. On the first night of WrestleMania 36 on April 4, Zayn defeated Bryan to retain the title. On May 12, he was stripped off the championship after refraining from competing during the COVID-19 pandemic, ending his reign at 65 days. On the August 28 episode of SmackDown, Zayn attacked Intercontinental Champion Jeff Hardy and declared himself the "real" Intercontinental Champion, eventually reuniting with Cesaro and Nakamura backstage; however, Cesaro dismissed him from the locker room so that he and Nakamura could have some discussion by themselves.

At Clash of Champions on September 27, Zayn defeated Hardy and AJ Styles in a triple threat ladder match to reclaim the Intercontinental Championship by handcuffing both with the ladders. On the October 2 episode of SmackDown, Zayn defeated Hardy to retain the title. On the November 13 episode of SmackDown, Zayn retained the title against Apollo Crews by countout. At Survivor Series on November 22, Zayn lost to United States Champion Bobby Lashley in a champion vs. champion match. On the December 25 episode of SmackDown, he lost the Intercontinental Championship to Big E, ending his second reign at 89 days.

At Royal Rumble on January 31, 2021, Zayn entered at #3 but was eliminated by Big E. On the February 12 episode of SmackDown, Zayn teamed with King Corbin and defeated The Mysterios (Rey Mysterio and Dominik Mysterio) to qualify for the Elimination Chamber match at the namesake event. At the event on February 21, Zayn was the second man eliminated by Kevin Owens. His gimmick would be tweaked into a deranged conspiracy theorist who believed that WWE bosses were holding him down, and he soon reignited his feud with Owens. Zayn lost to Owens on the second night of WrestleMania 37 on April 11 but defeated him in a rematch at Hell in a Cell on June 20. On the July 2 episode of SmackDown, Zayn failed to qualify for the men's Money in the Bank ladder match at the namesake event after losing to Owens in a Last Man Standing match, ending their rivalry.

In October, Zayn entered the King of the Ring tournament, where he defeated Rey Mysterio in the first round but lost to Finn Bálor in the semi-finals. On November 6, Zayn was announced as a part of Team SmackDown at Survivor Series, however, on the November 12 episode of SmackDown, Zayn faced Jeff Hardy in a match with the stipulation that whoever lost was removed from the SmackDown Survivor Series team, which Zayn lost, thus removing him. On the November 26 episode of SmackDown, Zayn would compete in a battle royal to determine the number one contender for the Universal Championship, last eliminating Jeff Hardy to win the match. On the December 3 episode of SmackDown, Zayn would face the champion Roman Reigns for the title, but lost in 15 seconds due to Brock Lesnar attacking him before the match. On the December 24 episode of SmackDown, Zayn won a 12-man gauntlet match to become the number one contender for the Intercontinental Championship.

On the January 7, 2022 episode of SmackDown, Zayn entered a feud with Johnny Knoxville after Knoxville announced he would be entering the Royal Rumble match. At Royal Rumble on January 29, Zayn entered at #8, eliminating Knoxville before he was eliminated by AJ Styles. On the February 18 (taped February 11) episode of SmackDown, Zayn defeated Shinsuke Nakamura to win the Intercontinental Championship for the third time in his career. On the March 4 episode of SmackDown, Zayn lost the title to Ricochet after interference from Knoxville, ending his reign at 21 days (recognized by WWE as 13 days). Zayn then challenged Knoxville to a match at WrestleMania 38 which was made official shortly after. The following week, Zayn failed to regain the Intercontinental Championship from Ricochet in a rematch. On the March 18 episode of SmackDown, Zayn added an Anything Goes stipulation to their match, and Knoxville accepted the challenge afterwards. On the second night of WrestleMania 38 on April 3, Zayn lost to Knoxville after the latter's Jackass co-actors interfered in the match.

Storyline with The Bloodline (2022–present) 

Having felt as he had lost respect and credibility in the locker room, starting on the April 22 episode of SmackDown, Zayn sought to seek favor with The Bloodline, the stable that was led by Roman Reigns. On the May 27 episode of SmackDown, after helping the group on a couple of occasions, Zayn was deemed an "Honorary Uce" and became an associate of the group. On the June 24 episode of SmackDown, Zayn defeated Shinsuke Nakamura to qualify for the Money in the Bank ladder match. At the eponymous event on July 2, Zayn failed to win as the match was won by Theory. On the August 19 episode of SmackDown, he competed in a fatal five-way match to determine the number one contender for the Intercontinental Championship, which was won by Sheamus. 

In the following weeks, the tensions between Zayn and Jey Uso, another member of The Bloodline, escalated as Jey did not trust Zayn, and they constantly argued. On the September 23 episode of SmackDown, Reigns declared Zayn an official "Honorary Uce". At Survivor Series WarGames, Zayn, along with The Bloodline, defeated the team of Drew McIntyre, Kevin Owens, and The Brawling Brutes (Sheamus, Butch, and Ridge Holland) in a WarGames match. After the match, due to Zayn showing his loyalty to the stable by delivering a low blow to Owens, Jey finally accepted Zayn as part of The Bloodline and the stable celebrated. In January 2023, Zayn would be in a conflict with The Bloodline, which led to a Tribal Court for Zayn at Raw is XXX, but would be found "not guilty, for now" in regard to betraying The Bloodline. 

At Royal Rumble, Reigns proceeded to have the rest of The Bloodline beat Owens down following the match, but Zayn refused to join the beatdown and eventually hit Reigns with a chair, leading to the entire Bloodline (excluding Jey) attacking Zayn, turning him face for the first time since 2017. On the February 3 episode of SmackDown, Zayn attacked Reigns and challenged him to a match for the Undisputed WWE Universal Championship at Elimination Chamber, which Reigns accepted. At the event on February 18, Zayn failed to win the titles from Reigns. On the March 6 episode of Raw, Jey Uso would interfere in a match between Zayn and Jimmy Uso, costing Jimmy the match, Jey would hug Sami but would end up betraying him, hitting him with a superkick then proceeding to beat him along with Jimmy and Solo Sikoa, Cody Rhodes would come to Sami's aid. On the March 10 episode of SmackDown, The Usos would cut a promo in the ring, with Jey explaining why he turned on Zayn, Cody Rhodes would interrupt them and Zayn would jump Jey, with Cody joining in on the fight, the fight would spill out into the crowd and Rhodes and Zayn would fight off The Usos. On the March 17 episode of SmackDown, Cody Rhodes would attempt to reunite Kevin Owens and Sami Zayn, with Kevin Owens refusing and leaving, Zayn would confront Owens, who was outside the arena, Owens would still refuse. In the main event, Zayn would face Jey Uso until Jimmy Uso would interfere which caused Owens to come out and save Zayn from the Usos, the two would hug it out in the ring, officially reuniting Owens and Zayn.

In other media 
Zayn is a playable character in the video games WWE 2K15, WWE 2K16, WWE 2K17, WWE 2K18, WWE 2K19, WWE 2K20, WWE 2K Battlegrounds, WWE 2K22 and WWE 2K23.

Personal life 
Sebei is known for being quiet about his private life. He is married and has a son. He is a Muslim and a vegan, and is fluent in English, Arabic, and French. Sebei is also best friends with fellow professional wrestler Kevin Steen, better known currently in WWE as Kevin Owens. Their friendship has been well documented, dating back to 2002.

In July 2017, Sebei set up a fund called Sami for Syria to support the Syrian American Medical Society.

Sebei, a Canadian citizen, endorsed Bernie Sanders in the 2020 Democratic Party presidential primaries.

Championships and accomplishments 

 Association de Lutte Féminine
 Sensational Sherri Memorial Cup Tournament (2007) – with LuFisto
 The Baltimore Sun
 WWE Match of the Year (2016) 
 Britannia Wrestling Promotions
 PWI:BWP World Catchweight Championship (1 time)
 Chikara
 Rey de Voladores (2011)
 DDT Pro-Wrestling / Union Pro Wrestling
 DDT Extreme Championship (1 time)
 KO-D Openweight Championship (1 time)
 Best Foreigner Award (2012)
 Elite Wrestling Revolution
 Elite 8 Tournament (2004)
 ESPN
 Best storyline of the year (2022) – 
 GBG Wrestling
 GBG Heavyweight Championship (1 time)
 International Wrestling Syndicate
 IWS World Heavyweight Championship (2 times)
 IWS World Tag Team Championship (1 time) – with Twiggy
Monteregie Wrestling Federation
MWF Provincial Championship (1 time)
 North Shore Pro Wrestling
 NSPW Championship (1 time)
 Pro Wrestling Guerrilla
 PWG World Championship (2 times)
 PWG World Tag Team Championship (5 times) – with Human Tornado (1), Quicksilver (1), Kevin Steen (2), and Paul London (1)
 Battle of Los Angeles (2011)
 Dynamite Duumvirate Tag Team Title Tournament (2010) – with Paul London
 Pro Wrestling Illustrated
 Faction of the Year (2022) – 
 Ranked No. 23 of the top 500 singles wrestlers in the PWI 500 in 2015
 Pro Wrestling Prestige
 PWP Heavyweight Championship (1 time)
 Puerto Rico Wrestling Association
 PRWA Caribbean Championship (1 time)
 Ring of Honor
 ROH World Television Championship (1 time)
 ROH World Tag Team Championship (1 time) – with Kevin Steen
 Match of the Decade (2010s) 
 SoCal Uncensored
 Match of the Year (2006) vs. PAC, November 18, Pro Wrestling Guerrilla
 Match of the Year (2007) vs. Bryan Danielson, July 29, Pro Wrestling Guerrilla
 Most Outstanding Wrestler (2006, 2007)
 Tag Team of the Year (2006) with Quicksilver
 Wrestler of the Year (2007)
 STHLM Wrestling
 STHLM Wrestling Championship (1 time)
 Westside Xtreme Wrestling
 wXw Unified World Wrestling Championship (1 time)
 16 Carat Gold Tournament (2012)
 Wrestling Observer Newsletter
 Feud of the Year (2010) 
Shad Gaspard/Jon Huber Memorial Award (2020)
Best Gimmick (2022)
 WWE
NXT Championship (1 time)
 WWE Intercontinental Championship (3 times)
 Slammy Award (1 time)
 NXT Superstar of the Year (2014)

Luchas de Apuestas record

References

External links 

 
 
 
 
 

1984 births
21st-century professional wrestlers
Canadian expatriate professional wrestlers in the United States
Canadian male professional wrestlers
Canadian Muslims
Canadian people of Arab descent
Canadian people of Syrian descent
Living people
Masked wrestlers
NXT Champions
Professional wrestlers from Quebec
ROH World Television Champions
Sportspeople from Laval, Quebec
WWF/WWE Intercontinental Champions
ROH World Tag Team Champions
PWG World Champions
PWG World Tag Team Champions
DDT Extreme Champions
KO-D Openweight Champions